Tselinny (masculine), Tselinnaya (feminine), or Tselinnoye (neuter) is the name of several  rural localities in Russia.

Altai Krai
As of 2010, four rural localities in Altai Krai bear this name:
Tselinny, Khabarsky District, Altai Krai, a settlement in Korotoyaksky Selsoviet of Khabarsky District
Tselinny, Klyuchevsky District, Altai Krai, a settlement in Novotselinny Selsoviet of Klyuchevsky District
Tselinny, Kytmanovsky District, Altai Krai, a settlement in Oktyabrsky Selsoviet of Kytmanovsky District
Tselinnoye, Altai Krai, a selo in Tselinny Selsoviet of Tselinny District

Republic of Bashkortostan
As of 2010, two rural localities in the Republic of Bashkortostan bear this name:
Tselinny, Republic of Bashkortostan, a selo in Almukhametovsky Selsoviet of Abzelilovsky District
Tselinnoye, Republic of Bashkortostan, a selo in Tselinny Selsoviet of Khaybullinsky District

Republic of Buryatia
As of 2010, one rural locality in the Republic of Buryatia bears this name:
Tselinny, Republic of Buryatia, a settlement in Tselinny Selsoviet of Yeravninsky District

Chelyabinsk Oblast
As of 2010, two rural localities in Chelyabinsk Oblast bear this name:
Tselinny, Kizilsky District, Chelyabinsk Oblast, a settlement in Izmaylovsky Selsoviet of Kizilsky District
Tselinny, Troitsky District, Chelyabinsk Oblast, a settlement in Kosobrodsky Selsoviet of Troitsky District

Irkutsk Oblast
As of 2010, one rural locality in Irkutsk Oblast bears this name:
Tselinny, Irkutsk Oblast, a settlement in Nukutsky District

Jewish Autonomous Oblast
As of 2010, one rural locality in the Jewish Autonomous Oblast bears this name:
Tselinnoye, Jewish Autonomous Oblast, a selo in Leninsky District

Republic of Khakassia
As of 2010, one rural locality in the Republic of Khakassia bears this name:
Tselinnoye, Republic of Khakassia, a selo in Tselinny Selsoviet of Shirinsky District

Krasnodar Krai
As of 2010, one rural locality in Krasnodar Krai bears this name:
Tselinny, Krasnodar Krai, a settlement in Tselinny Rural Okrug of Slavyansky District

Kurgan Oblast
As of 2010, one rural locality in Kurgan Oblast bears this name:
Tselinnoye, Kurgan Oblast, a selo in Tselinny Selsoviet of Tselinny District

Novosibirsk Oblast
As of 2010, four rural localities in Novosibirsk Oblast bear this name:
Tselinny, Iskitimsky District, Novosibirsk Oblast, a settlement in Iskitimsky District
Tselinny (Sadovsky Rural Settlement), Krasnozyorsky District, Novosibirsk Oblast, a settlement in Krasnozyorsky District; municipally, a part of Sadovsky Rural Settlement of that district
Tselinny (Maysky Rural Settlement), Krasnozyorsky District, Novosibirsk Oblast, a settlement in Krasnozyorsky District; municipally, a part of Maysky Rural Settlement of that district
Tselinnoye, Novosibirsk Oblast, a selo in Kochenyovsky District

Omsk Oblast
As of 2010, two rural localities in Omsk Oblast bear this name:
Tselinnoye, Cherlaksky District, Omsk Oblast, a village in Krasnooktyabrsky Rural Okrug of Cherlaksky District
Tselinnoye, Russko-Polyansky District, Omsk Oblast, a selo in Tselinny Rural Okrug of Russko-Polyansky District

Orenburg Oblast
As of 2010, one rural locality in Orenburg Oblast bears this name:
Tselinny, Orenburg Oblast, a settlement in Tselinny Selsoviet of Svetlinsky District

Rostov Oblast
As of 2010, one rural locality in Rostov Oblast bears this name:
Tselinny, Rostov Oblast, a khutor in Konzavodskoye Rural Settlement of Zernogradsky District

Saratov Oblast
As of 2010, three rural localities in Saratov Oblast bear this name:
Tselinny, Krasnopartizansky District, Saratov Oblast, a settlement in Krasnopartizansky District
Tselinny, Perelyubsky District, Saratov Oblast, a settlement in Perelyubsky District
Tselinny, Yershovsky District, Saratov Oblast, a settlement in Yershovsky District

Stavropol Krai
As of 2010, one rural locality in Stavropol Krai bears this name:
Tselinny, Stavropol Krai, a settlement in Iskrovsky Selsoviet of Budyonnovsky District

Tuva Republic
As of 2010, one rural locality in the Tuva Republic bears this name:
Tselinnoye, Tuva Republic, a selo in Tselinnoye Sumon (Rural Settlement) of Kyzylsky District

Volgograd Oblast
As of 2010, one rural locality in Volgograd Oblast bears this name:
Tselinny, Volgograd Oblast, a settlement in Sovkhozsky Selsoviet of Nikolayevsky District

Zabaykalsky Krai
As of 2010, one rural locality in Zabaykalsky Krai bears this name:
Tselinny, Zabaykalsky Krai, a settlement in Krasnokamensky District